Mount Kubor (also known as  Mount Leahy  in honor of Mick Leahy (explorer) ) is a peak in the Kubor Range in the New Guinea Highlands, in the Simbu Province of Papua New Guinea.

History 
Mount Kubor  was named in 1933 by a member of the first Western expedition group to survey the area.

References 

Kubor
Chimbu Province